Field's is a shopping centre in Ørestad, Copenhagen, close to the E20 motorway and Ørestad Station on the Copenhagen Metro. At 115,000 m2, it is the second-largest mall in Denmark after Waves, and one of the largest in Scandinavia. It is owned by Steen & Strøm Danmark A/S and was designed by C. F. Møller Architects, Evenden and Haskolls.

History 
Field's opened on 9 March 2004, with more than 250,000 customers visiting the centre during its first week in business. Field's occupies more than 115,000 m2 under one roof and features a total of approx. 150 stores, with more than 70 specialising in clothing, fashion or footwear.

2022 shooting 

On 3 July 2022, three people were shot and killed in a mass shooting at Field's. A 22-year-old Danish man was later arrested by police.

Shops and restaurants 
 KFC
 Burger King
 Hunkemöller
 Bilka
 H&M
 Quiksilver
 Skechers
 The Body Shop
 Kings and Queens

References

External links

 Fields - Official website (Danish)
 About Fields (English)

Amager
Shopping centres in Copenhagen